The Indian Order of Merit (IOM) was a military and civilian decoration of British India. It was established in 1837, (General Order of the Governor-General of India, No. 94 of 1 May 1837) although following the Partition of India in 1947 it was decided to discontinue the award and in 1954 a separate Indian honours system was developed, to act retrospectively to 1947. For a long period of time the IOM was the highest decoration that a native member of the British Indian Army could receive and initially it had three divisions. This was changed in 1911 when Indian servicemen became eligible for the Victoria Cross. A civilian division of the IOM also existed between 1902 and 1939, however, it was only conferred very rarely.

History
The medal was first introduced by the East India Company in 1837, under the name "Order of Merit" and was taken over by the Crown in 1858, following the Indian Rebellion of 1857. The name of the medal was changed in 1902 to avoid confusion with a British Order of the same name. The Indian Order of Merit was the only gallantry medal available to Native soldiers between 1837 and 1907 when the Indian Distinguished Service Medal was introduced, and when the Victoria Cross was opened to native soldiers in 1911. Both divisions of the order were removed when India became independent in 1947. Recipients receive the post nominal letters IOM.

The original object was to "afford personal reward for personal bravery without reference to any claims founded on mere length of service and general good conduct"

The medal

Military Division

The medal was originally introduced with three classes (first, second and third classes), until others medals were made available to Indian soldiers, at which point it was reduced to two classes (the Victoria Cross replacing the first class), and reduced to one class in 1944. A recipient technically needed to be in possession of the lower class before being awarded a higher class, although recipients were sometimes awarded the higher class if they performed more than one act of gallantry, then they may have been awarded the higher class, without receiving the lower one. The  recipients of the order received increased pay and pension allowances and were very highly regarded.

Civil Division

A civil division was available in two classes between 1902 and 1939, when it was reduced to one class. The civil medal was rarely awarded.

Description

Third Class

Eight pointed dull silver star with blue circle, surrounded by silver laurels, in the middle, with crossed swords and the words Awarded for Valour, this was changed to Awarded for Gallantry in 1944.

Conspicuous act of individual gallantry on the part of any Native Officers or Soldiers, in the Field or in the attack or defence of a Fortified place, without distinction of rank or grade.

Second Class

Eight pointed shiny silver star with blue circle, surrounded by gold laurels in the middle, with crossed swords and the words Awarded for Valour, this was changed to Awarded for Gallantry in 1944.

To be obtained by those who already possess the third and for similar services.

First Class

Eight pointed gold star with blue circle, surrounded by gold laurels in the middle, with crossed swords and the words Awarded for Valour, this was changed to Awarded for Gallantry in 1944.

To be obtained in like manner only by those who possess the third and second classes.

Ribbon

Dark Blue ribbon flanked by two red stripes of about a sixth of the width.

Notable recipients

The first recipient of the IOM was Sub Devi Singh of Bengal Sappers who along with 12 sappers demolished the impregnable gates of the Ghazni fort in Afghanistan on 23 July 1839.
Subedar Mir Dast 
Subedar Kishanbir Nagarkoti, I.O.M. 1/5 GR (FF) Only person to have been awarded the IOM four times and hence awarded a gold clasp as recognition.
Maharajadhiraja Bahadur Sir Bijay Chand Mahtab 
Sowar A.L. Dafadar Udey Singh, 1726 was awarded Indian Order of Merit for his gallant action and playing important role in pushing the enemy forces back during his time in France during World War I.
 All 21 soldiers of the detachment of 36th Sikhs British Indian Army which fought to the death against overwhelming numbers at the Battle of Saragarhi in 1897.
 Havildar Karbir Pun was awarded the I.O.M. for his joint actions along with John Duncan Grant who was awarded the Victoria Cross along with other members of the 8th Gurkha Rifles on July 6, 1904 at the attack at Gyantse Dzong, Tibet as a part of the British invasion of Tibet with Colonel Younghusband
 Havildar Nur Khan, I.O.M., I.D.S.M., Regt No-13535, 3/2 Punjab Regiment, for planning and implementing and escape plan from Nazi POW camp at Tobruk, Libya  
 Subadar-Major and Hon. Captain Bisesar (alternatively spelt Bissesar) Tewari, Surdar Bahadur, the senior Indian officer of the 1st Brahmans regiment from 1909 to 1914. As a sepoy (private) in 1886, he was awarded the Indian Order of Merit (IOM), 2nd Class for his bravery in the 3rd Burma War (1885): 'in charging the enemy's position, when suffering from a severe wound in the neck, and remaining in action during the whole day.'
Subedar Major (Hon. Capt.) Sardar Bahadur Muhammad Ismail, I.O.M. 2nd Class 1897, O.B.I. 2nd Class 1909, O.B.I. 1st Class 1917 - 32nd Mountain Battery British India Army
Sub. Major & Hon. Capt. Rithu Singh Rawat, I.O.M., I.D.S.M., M.D., 3rd Battalion 18th Royal Garhwal Rifles, for acts of gallantry in the Middle East, during World War II, on the 3rd of May 1941 vide Gazette of India No. 113-
Sardar Bahadur Arjan Singh Bhullar, I.O.M., O.B.I., 1st Punjab Sikh Regiment

References

Further reading

 
 . Further volumes of this comprehensive work are in the process of compilation and will bring the records up to 1947, ultimately.

External links
Search recommendations for the Indian Order of Merit on The UK National Archives' website.
 The Website of the Indian Military Historical Society

Orders, decorations, and medals of British India
Military awards and decorations of India
Civil awards and decorations of the United Kingdom
Military awards and decorations of the United Kingdom
Orders, decorations, and medals of India
Orders of merit
Awards established in 1837
Medals of the Honourable East India Company